Ferenc Helbing (25 December 1870 – 28 January 1958) was a Hungarian graphic artist and painter.

Helbing was born in Érsekújvár, Kingdom of Hungary (today Nové Zámky, Slovakia). He started his career as a lithographer. After studying applied graphics and applied arts, he became a printing manager. He taught at the College of Applied Graphics (from 1906) then at the College of Applied Arts (from 1910); he managed the latter until 1936. He made a pioneer work in the field of the Hungarian commercial graphics. He was the designer of many Hungarian banknotes. He also created posters, stamps, illustrations for books, glass paintings and murals (e.g. at the Palace Hotel (Palotaszálló) in Lillafüred) and won a number of prizes on applied arts and graphics competitions. Some of his works can be seen in the Hungarian National Gallery.

He died in Budapest.

See also

Hungarian korona banknotes designed by Ferenc Helbing
Hungarian pengő banknotes designed by Ferenc Helbing

References
Magyar Életrajzi Lexikon

External links
Magyar Nemzeti Galéria (Hungarian National Gallery, homepage in English)

1870 births
1958 deaths
Designers of Hungarian banknotes and coins
People from Nové Zámky
20th-century Hungarian painters
Hungarian male painters
20th-century Hungarian male artists